"Child's Play" is a 1995 Marvel Comics crossover storyline featuring the New Warriors, X-Force, and the Upstarts. It is also the first time Karma reunites with the New Mutants since she left the team in New Mutants #54 (1987).

Summary
The Upstarts continue their series of games to prove their power and worth to one another. This time, they devise "the Younghunt", a mission to capture all of the surviving members of the New Mutants (some of whom are now members of X-Force) and the Hellions. This competition also brings the Upstarts into conflict with the New Warriors (as Firestar is a former Hellion). The Upstarts acquire most of their targets, who are pitted against X-Force and the New Warriors during the crossover's climax. However, Paige Guthrie, who secretly followed X-Force on the rescue mission, is able to convince the Gamesmaster to play another game—instead of killing mutants, the Upstarts should compete with the mutant leaders of the world to try to find and train young mutants like herself. The Gamesmaster is intrigued by the proposition and cancels the competition.

This crossover marks a watershed moment for several characters. Moonstar, still affiliated with the Mutant Liberation Front, unmasks herself to her former teammates during this event, and reveals that she is, in fact, Dani Moonstar and not an imposter. She maintains her cover and does not reveal she is working for S.H.I.E.L.D. to her teammates at this juncture, but this marks the first hint that she does not buy into the MLF's agenda.

The retcon of the origin of Nova Roma is very much a part of the storyline. (This retcon was in turn retconned in more recent comics.) Accordingly, during this story, Magma divorces herself from the Amara Aquilla persona and decides to uncover her origins as “Alison Crestmere.” In the process, she demands Empath keep his distance.

Younghunt results

Non-participants

Despite the large number of characters involved, many former members of the Hellions and New Mutants do not appear.

Deceased members of the New Mutants and the Hellions not available for capture include: Cypher, Warlock, Jetstream, Beef, Bevatron, Catseye, Roulette, and Magik.

Sunspot was a surviving New Mutant who was not targeted by the Upstarts because he and Locus were lost in the timestream at that time. Rusty and Skids, also former New Mutants, were not targeted in the Younghunt, likely because of their affiliation with the Acolytes and were under Magneto's protection, far from Earth on Avalon.

Tie-in issues
X-Force (vol. 1) #32 (Move 1)
The New Warriors (vol. 1) #45 (Move 2)
X-Force (vol. 1) #33 (Move 3)
The New Warriors (vol. 1) #46 (Move 4)

External links